Ocotlán (from the Nahuatl ocotl ("pine tree"), meaning "place of pines") may refer to:

Languages
Ocotlán Zapotec, Zapotec language of Oaxaca, Mexico

Places in Mexico
Ocotlán, Jalisco
Battle of Ocotlán (1924) 
Ocotlán de Morelos (Oaxaca)
Ocotlán de Juárez (Oaxaca)
Ocotlán District (Oaxaca)
Asunción Ocotlán (Oaxaca)
Magdalena Ocotlán (Oaxaca)
San Dionisio Ocotlán (Oaxaca)
San Francisco de Ocotlán (Puebla)
Ocotlán, Tlaxcala 
Virgin of Ocotlán, Marian apparition in 1541 
Battle of Ocotlán (1856) 
San Pedro Ocotlán (Zacatecas)

Events
2015 Ocotlán ambush